Reading Cinemas is a group of cinema chains operating in the United States, New Zealand, and Australia.  They are owned by the American company Reading International.

History 

In the late 1980s, through his holding company the Craig Corporation, Los Angeles-based lawyer James Cotter acquired the Reading Company, a former American railroad company that held a portfolio of real estate properties after it sold its railroad assets and rolling stock in 1976. Through the rest of the 1990s, Cotter acquired, developed, and operated real estate properties, focusing on cinema exhibitors and live theatre operators. Most of the company's holdings by this time were located far beyond the company's historical native ground of eastern Pennsylvania.

Reading entered Australia in 1995 and New Zealand in 1997, developing a chain of multiplex cinemas that operated under the Reading banner and exhibited mainstream films. In the United States, Reading pursued a more offbeat business direction, acquiring an art-house theatre at the historic Cable Building in New York City in 1996 that operated under the name Angelika Film Center. The company also acquired and expanded a chain of multiplex cinemas throughout the island of Puerto Rico.

By 1996 Cotter reorganized the company as Reading Entertainment, a Delaware corporation, and on December 31, 2001, both Reading Entertainment and Craig Corporation merged into and with Citadel Holding Corporation, another Cotter company.

James Cotter died in August 2014, leaving his investment in the company in trusts that have been subjected to multiple years of litigation between his designated successor CEO, his son James Jr., and his daughters (Jr.'s sisters), Ellen and Margaret. In 2015, James Jr. was ousted by his sisters and a majority of the board of Reading International and Ellen Cotter subsequently was named CEO.

See also 
 Consolidated Theatres
 Angelika Film Center

References

External links
Official website

1995 establishments in Australia
Cinema chains in Australia
Companies affiliated with the Reading Company
Entertainment companies established in 1995
Movie theatre chains in the United States